Sunny Side is an unincorporated community in southwestern Frederick County, Maryland, United States. The village is located between U.S. Route 15 and U.S. Route 340, south of Jefferson and northwest of Adamstown. The Sunny Side United Methodist Church is located in the community.

Unincorporated communities in Frederick County, Maryland
Unincorporated communities in Maryland